Alex Kelly (born May 8, 1967) is an American convicted rapist.

Early life
Alex Kelly is the son of Melanie Reisdorf Kelly, a travel agent, and Joe Kelly, a plumber. He grew up in the Noroton Heights section of Darien, Connecticut.  In 1986, he graduated from Darien High School.

His older brother, Christopher, died of a drug overdose in 1991 while Kelly was on the run. His younger brother, Russell, died in 2004 in a car accident in Yellowstone National Park, while Kelly was incarcerated.

Crimes 
Kelly was charged with committing two rapes within a four-day period in Darien, Connecticut, in February 1986.  He was charged first with the rape of a 16-year-old Stamford girl, and then of a teenager in Darien.  In one of the rapes, according to the police, he encountered a girl who lived near him and offered her a ride home from a party. He was later also charged with drug possession and two counts of kidnapping.

In addition to those cases, five other women have told prosecutors and an author that Kelly raped them when he was a teen, although he has never been charged with those attacks.

Before his trial was due to begin on February 16, 1987, Kelly fled the United States and spent the next seven years on the run, mostly in Europe.  Kelly's parents allegedly supported him financially during this seven-year period, although they may have been unaware of his exact locations. Law enforcement authorities suspected that the parents had been in contact with their son and, on at least one occasion, raided the parents' house in an attempt to find evidence of Kelly's location or their assistance to him.

In January 1995, the Connecticut State Police discovered photos in the Kelly home of Alex with his parents in Europe the previous year. His parents were charged with obstruction, after which Kelly surrendered in Switzerland.  He was extradited to the United States on rape and kidnapping charges.  Several lesser counts were excluded, as they were not specifically listed in the extradition treaty between the two nations.  
While out on bail, Kelly was allowed by the court to take classes at Norwalk Community College.
Kelly faced two trials in 1997.  After the first was declared a mistrial, the second resulted in his conviction for the first rape and a sentence of 10 years in prison. He pleaded no contest to the second rape and was sentenced to an additional 10 years in prison (sentence to run concurrently with the 10-year sentence).

In 2005, after having served eight years of his 10-year sentence, Kelly appeared before a Connecticut parole board; his bid for release was rejected. At the hearing Kelly apologized many times saying he was "hypercompetitive" and self-centered, and that he has finally realized that the world is bigger than him.

On November 24, 2007, Kelly was released from prison on good behavior. He is required to serve 10 years probation, perform 200 hours of community service, pay a $10,000 fine, and register with the Connecticut sex offender registry. Kelly has claimed that, while in prison, he earned a bachelor's degree in economics and third-world development.

He has since worked as a skydiving instructor.

Portrayals in the media 
Kelly's story was recounted in an episode of Dominick Dunne's Court TV series Dominick Dunne's Power, Privilege, and Justice. Crime in Connecticut: The Story of Alex Kelly (also known as The Return of Alex Kelly), is based on Alex Kelly.  The Kelly case was also featured in an episode of A&E Network's series American Justice and featured on ABC's news magazine show, Turning Point, whose segment title was "Fugitive Son: The Hunt for Alex Kelly." Vanity Fair Confidential aired an episode entitled "The Fugitive Son" on January 23, 2017.

References

External links 
Connecticut: Stamford: Rapist Won't Seek New Trial

Crime in Connecticut
Connecticut Sex Offender Registry page 

1967 births
20th-century American criminals
American prisoners and detainees
American people convicted of rape
Living people
Place of birth missing (living people)
People from Darien, Connecticut
Prisoners and detainees of Connecticut
People extradited from Switzerland
People extradited to the United States
American male criminals
Wealth in the United States
Crimes in Connecticut
Darien High School alumni